Elin Fflur Llewelyn Harvey (née Jones; born 26 July 1984), known professionally as Elin Fflur, is a Welsh singer-songwriter, television and radio presenter.

Early life
Fflur was born in Llanfairpwllgwyngyll, Anglesey and was the oldest of three children of Gerallt and Nêst Jones. She was educated at Ysgol David Hughes secondary school in the town of Menai Bridge, and later at Bangor University. Fflur began taking part in local Eisteddfodau from the age of three and became a familiar name in National Eisteddfodau thereafter. She later studied criminology at university, but left after her first year.

Her musical roots began with her mother, who was the lead vocalist of the Welsh-folk band Bran in their early, prog-rock releases. The band Bran became known for winning Cân i Gymru in 1978.

Career

Fflur participated in Cân i Gymru in 2002, the 33rd edition of the competition. She won the competition with the song "Harbwr Diogel" ("Safe Bay") composed by Arfon Wyn. She competed again in Cân i Gymru in 2009, but was unsuccessful this time. She was part of bands like Carlotta (with her brother Ioan) and Y Moniars.

She now works as a presenter on S4C, initially on the music roadshow Nodyn, which ran for 4 series between 2008–2011. Since 2011, Fflur has co-presented Cân i Gymru on S4C with Dafydd Meredydd (2011–2013), Gethin Evans (2014) and Trystan Ellis-Morris (2015–present).

In 2012, she became one of the main presenters of the evening magazine programme Heno. She presented her first show on 14 May 2012. Fflur later became an anchor for Welsh annual events such as the Urdd National Eisteddfod, Llangollen International Musical Eisteddfod and the National Eisteddfod of Wales. She has also presented episodes of Noson Lawen.

On 9 September 2018, she took part in an S4C documentary, Chdi, Fi ac IVF, which followed the attempts she and her husband, Jason Harvey, had gone through to conceive a baby using IVF.

In 2018, Fflur stood-in for the BBC Radio Cymru 2 breakfast show when main presenters Dafydd Meredydd and Caryl Parry Jones were absent.

In 2020, she started presenting Sgwrs dan y Lloer ("A conversation under the moonlight"). The series features Fflur meeting with a celebrity guest and having an intimate conversation with them in their own back garden.

Personal life

Fflur has two brothers; Gwion Llŷr Llewelyn, and Ioan Llewelyn.

On 15 December 2012, Fflur married Jason Rusell Harvey, a former Llanfairpwll F.C. football player. The couple have spoken openly about their struggles to conceive naturally, and turning their efforts to IVF treatment in an attempt to conceive. Medically, she is unable to conceive naturally as her fallopian tubes are defective.

Filmography

Discography

Singles

Albums

Compilation albums

References

External links
Elin Fflur biography from BBC Wales

1984 births
Welsh-language singers
Living people
People from Anglesey
21st-century Welsh women singers
Welsh-language television presenters
Welsh television presenters
Welsh women television presenters
Welsh singer-songwriters
Welsh-speaking musicians
People educated at Ysgol David Hughes